The 707th Special Mission Group (Hanja: 第707特殊任務團) is an elite counter-terrorism unit of the Republic of Korea Army Special Warfare Command.

History
The unit was formed after the Munich massacre, which forced the South Korean government to create a counter-terrorist unit in time for the 1988 Olympics that would be held in South Korea. In 1984, B Squadron of Delta Force traveled to South Korea to conduct training with the 707th. 

Prior to reorganization the 707th Battalion had about 200 men and women organized into a:
 Counter-Terrorism Team
 Maritime-Operations Team
 Air-Assault Team
 Sniper Team
 Intelligence Company 
 All-female Company
The all-female company could be used as bodyguards or for low-visibility operations, all divided into fourteen-man operating teams, as well as support and demolition teams. The all-female company was deactivated in 2014. 

The unit has also been called on by the South Korean government to prioritize potential counter-terrorist operations against any possible threats on South Korean soil.  The unit is South Korea's primary counter-terrorist and quick reaction force. The unit's soldiers – once distinguished by their black berets (before the standardization of the black beret for all active soldiers) – are tasked with conducting urban counter-terrorist missions, and constitute the Army's quick-reaction force for emergencies. The unit's nickname is 'White Tiger.'

In February 2019, the former 707th Special Mission Battalion was reorganized and renamed into the 707th Special Mission Group (Hangul: 제707특수임무단) with additional personnel and equipment to ensure higher readiness against various threats. It is now commanded by a Colonel instead of a Lieutenant Colonel.

Since 2011, the 707th Special Mission Group has maintained a presence in the United Arab Emirates as part of the South Korean Special Operations Forces contingent, named 'Akh Unit,' deployed there to train local forces.

1982 Korean Air Force transport crash

On 5 February 1982, the unit suffered a devastating blow, when a Fairchild C-123J carrying 47 of its members, along with six Korean Air Force personnel, were killed in a crash while on approach to Jeju International Airport, Jeju, South Korea. It was the deadliest peacetime accident the Korean armed forces experienced since the Korean War, with the exception of another Air Force C-123 that crashed into Mt. Choenggye on 1 June 1982, killing 53, including 49 commandos and four air force personnel.

Training
The recruitment process usually involves conscripts from different branches of the Republic of Korea Armed Forces who apply and try out to become members of the elite force. Others are handpicked by their superiors across the different branches of the military and try out like their applicant counterparts. The selection process is very rigorous. First applicants will undergo a background check and then undergo a 10-day procedure in which 90% are eliminated.

All members of the 707th Group are SCUBA Diver or UDT/SEAL's and airborne qualified. It is reported that members frequently perform daily calisthenics in the snow and sub-zero temperatures and will swim in freezing lakes without any thermal protection.

707th maintains close ties with similar units from around the globe, including Singapore's STAR group, the Australian Special Air Service Regiment and Hong Kong's Special Duties Unit (SDU) although the unit's closest ties are with the US Army's 1st Special Forces Group, Delta Force  and the British Army
s Special Air Service.

The 707th Group also owns and operates a multi-complex counter-terrorism training site for the Republic of Korea Army Special Warfare Command and hosts multi-national counter-terrorist training.

Equipment
The 707th SMG is known to be using the M2016 Special Warfare Command four-colour desert digital pattern.https://www.joint-forces.com/kit-camo/62546-camo-spotted-at-idex-2023-in-abu-dhabi

References

External links
Specialoperations.com report

1982 establishments in South Korea
Counterterrorist organizations
Military units and formations established in 1982
Special forces of the Republic of Korea